Anton Freiherr von Winzor (1844–1910) was Governor of Bosnia and Herzegovina between 1907 and 1909, and also first governor of Bosnia and Herzegovina after its annexation in 1908. He was born in Jaroslavice.

Notes

References

1844 births
1910 deaths
Governors of Bosnia and Herzegovina
Barons of Austria
Austrian politicians
People from Znojmo District
Theresian Military Academy alumni